The 2019 Guatemala City mayoral election was held on 16 June 2019.

The elections will be held next to the presidential, legislative, municipal and Central American Parliament elections. Twenty-three candidates were presented.

The current mayor Ricardo Quiñónez took office after the death of Álvaro Arzú, and is presented for the first time as a candidate for mayor and maintain the hegemony of the Unionist Party in Guatemala City.

The polls show a close contest between the opposition candidate Roberto González Díaz-Durán from the Commitment, Renewal and Order (CREO), which competes for the third time to win the mayor's office and the current mayor Ricardo Quiñónez Lemus of Unionist Party.

They are followed by Álvaro Véliz of Semilla, Luis García of Fuerza and Fernando Sánchez of the National Unity of Hope.

In this election, they are also elected to titular and alternate councilors who will make up the Municipal Council of Guatemala City.

Opinion polls  
The table below lists voting intention estimates in reverse chronological order, showing the most recent first and using the dates when the survey fieldwork was done, as opposed to the date of publication. Where the fieldwork dates are unknown, the date of publication is given instead. The highest percentage figure in each polling survey is displayed with its background shaded in the leading party's colour. If a tie ensues, this is applied to the figures with the highest percentages. 

The "Lead" column on the right shows the percentage-point difference between the parties with the highest percentages in a given poll. When available, seat projections are also displayed below the voting estimates in a smaller font.

Results

References

Elections in Guatemala